Undoing may refer to:

Undoing (psychology)
Undoing (film)
The Undoing, 2020 HBO miniseries
The Undoing (album), by Steffany Gretzinger